The 1956–57 season was the 9th season of competitive football in Israel and the 31st season under the Israeli Football Association, established in 1928, during the British Mandate.

Review and Events
In September 1956, the national team participated in the inaugural AFC Asian Cup competition, finishing as runners-up.

In the penultimate round of Liga Alef, Hapoel Kfar Saba, who were leading the table, scored a 12–0 victory against Hapoel Nahariya, while its rival for promotion, Maccabi Rehovot score an 11–0 victory against local rival Maccabi Sha'arayim. The IFA set up a committee, headed by the IFA president, Yosef-Michael Lamm to investigate the results. After the investigation the committee decided to set promotion play-offs for the five teams involved in promotion battles. The play-offs were held after the summer break, at the beginning of the next season.

At the end of the league season, the top division was re-expanded to 12 teams. No club was relegated from Liga Leumit, while two teams were promoted (after the completion of the special promotion play-offs). The bottom club in Liga Leumit, Maccabi Jaffa entered a promotion/relegation play-offs again the third-placed club from 1956–57 Liga Alef. As Hapoel Jerusalem finished third in Liga Alef, prior to the committee's decision to hold the promotion play-offs, Maccabi Jaffa and Hapoel Jerusalem played the first match, resulting in a 1–1 draw. The second match was delayed and then cancelled as the committee ordered the play-offs.

Domestic leagues

Promotion and relegation
The following promotions and relegations took place at the end of the season (including the Liga Alef promotion play-offs, played at the beginning of the next season):

Promoted to Liga Leumit
 Hapoel Kfar Saba
 Hapoel Jerusalem

Promoted to Liga Alef
 Hapoel Balfouria1
 Maccabi Hadera
 Shimshon Tel Aviv
 Bnei Yehuda

Promoted to Liga Bet
 Hapoel Safed
 Beitar Netanya
 Hapoel Holon
 Sektzia Nes Tziona

Relegated from Liga Leumit
None

Relegated from Liga Alef
 Hapoel Nahariya
 Maccabi Ramat Gan

Relegated from Liga Bet
 Maccabi Zikhron Ya'akov
 Hapoel HaMegabesh Rishon LeZion
 Hapoel Mefalsim Sha'ar HaNegev

1. Hapoel Balfouria merged with Hapoel Afula. The merged team, although at times appearing as Hapoel Balfouria or Hapoel Afula/Balfouria, eventually retained the name Hapoel Afula and played with this name since.

National teams

National team

1956 AFC Asian Cup

1956–57 matches

References

 
Seasons in Israeli football